Star Awards 20 (also SA20, Chinese: 红星大奖 20) was a double television award ceremony which was held in Singapore. It is part of the annual Star Awards organised by MediaCorp for the two free-to-air channels, MediaCorp Channels 8 and U. The twentieth installment of Star Awards was broadcast live on Channel 8, on 20 and 27 April 2014. The first ceremony was held at the MediaCorp TV Theatre while the second ceremony was held at Suntec Singapore International Convention and Exhibition Centre. These ceremonies will also be broadcast on 8 International and the second ceremony on Toggle, Astro AEC (SD) and Astro Quan Jia HD (HD).

As with the previous four years, viewers will be able to catch the presentation of the Professional awards (given out to backstage crew and scriptwriters) on Channel 8. The ceremony was aired live on April 20, while the annual Star Awards prize presentation (for performance based and popularity awards) was aired on April 27. A post-show was held after the awards ceremony on April 27, which was broadcast on Channel U at 10.00pm.

The ceremony will celebrate its 20th year, hence the original title of Star Awards 2014 was renamed. Television drama The Dream Makers garnered 21 nominations, the most nominations in history since The Little Nyonya in 2009 (which tied the most wins with nine). These records would later be broken two years later, where the second season of The Dream Makers surpassed the number of nominations and wins with 26 and 12, respectively.

Programme details

Winners and nominees 
Unless otherwise stated, winners are listed first, highlighted in boldface. A 1 next to the nomination indicate that a representative will collect the award in place of the nominee.

Show 1 (颁奖典礼第一场) 
The first show was broadcast live on 20 April 2014 at the MediaCorp TV Theatre in Caldecott Hill. The show opened at 7.00pm with a three-minute-long parody skit of The Dream Makers before snippets of the host introductions were played followed by Chen Shucheng declaring the start of the award ceremony.

Awards Eligible for Voting

Most Popular Regional Artiste Award
The Most Popular Regional Artiste Award was newly introduced this year, where regional fans voted as part of its glitz and glamour by casting their votes online. Up to four awards are up for grabs, based on the four territories, namely China, Malaysia, Indonesia and Cambodia.

Colour key

Special Awards 
The results for Social Media Award are based on the calculations from three international social media analysis systems, which measures the social media engagement of qualifying nominees. They must be active on at least one of the following platforms in order to qualify for the award: Facebook, Twitter and Instagram.

The Rocket award, first introduced in 2010, was featured to the artiste with the most improvement in the performance of his/her respective field of profession for the past year.

Viewership awards 

 Winnie Wong (producer of The Dream Makers) represented Koong and Wong (who is unable to come to the ceremony due to her hospitalization) to collect the Best Theme Song and Best Director awards, respectively.
 Joanne Peh represented Qi to collect the Favourite Onscreen Couple award.

Show 2 (颁奖典礼第二场)
The second show was broadcast live on 27 April 2014 at the Suntec Singapore Convention and Exhibition Centre.

Professionally Judged Awards

Special Awards 
The All-Time Favourite Artiste is a special achievement award given out to artiste(s) who have achieved a maximum of 10 popularity awards over 10 years. Top 10 winning years the recipients were awarded together are highlighted in boldface.

Awards Eligible for Voting

Top 10 awards 
Since 2012, results for the Top 10 Most Popular Male and Female Artistes were by telepoll and online voting, each having a weightage of 50% towards the final results. The telepoll lines were announced on 14 March 2014 during a pre-show party. Voting opened from 14 March and closed on 27 April at 8:30pm.

The nominees are listed in telepoll line order. The results of the Top 10 awards are not in rank order.

Post Show Party Awards

Statistics 

Drama series nominations:

Variety / info-ed series nominations:

Current affairs series nominations:

Drama series awards:

Variety / info-ed / current affairs series awards:

Presenters and performers 
The following individuals presented awards or performed musical numbers.

Show 1

Show 2

Trivia

Awards categories
This year introduced four award categories: Social Media Award, Most Popular Regional Artiste Award, Asian Skin Solutions Most Radiant Skin Award and London Choco Roll Happiness Award.
The Favourite Host award was retired as it was purely based on the popularity of the host, which would already have been taken into account in the Top 10 awards.
This is the first Star Awards ceremony with several changes:
The show sponsors were credited on narration during the credits, as it was previously done on other award ceremonies such as the Academy Awards.
The Best Theme Song award now include online voting, making it the first time a professional-judged award category incorporate public votes as the determinant of the award. Both components carries a 50% weightage.
Award categories can only be presented if the quota of a minimal 10 candidates, is fulfilled. Best News Presenter, Best Current Affairs Presenter and Best Newcomer awards were suspended due to lack of eligible nominees as a result of the change. However, even though Channel 8 News & Current Affairs already had ten news presenters by the end of 2014, only the Best Newcomer returned in the following year (except 2016 and 2017), while the Best News Presenter and Best Current Affairs Presenter had not presented since 2013. In their place, the Best News Story and Best Current Affairs Story awards were given out on Show 2 instead of Show 1.

Ceremony information
Justin Ang is the first MediaCorp artiste to be nominated for the Top 10 Most Popular Male Artistes Award without appearing in a Mandarin production.
For the first time, there are three recipients each for the Best Variety Producer and Best Director awards. Gan Bee Khim, Mandy Tan and Lim Shiong Chiang won the Best Variety Producer award, while Wong Foong Hwee, Leong Lye Lin and Chong Liung Man won the Best Director award.
Priscelia Chan is the first female winner for the Rocket Award. The past winners for the award were all males.
Romeo Tan, Zhang Zhen Huan, Desmond Tan, Xu Bin, Chris Tong and Ya Hui received their first Top 10 Most Popular Artistes award this year.
This was the most recent show the ceremony was held outside the MediaCorp studios, until the 2021 ceremony, which was held at the Jewel Changi Airport and on Terminal 4.

Star Awards 2015 nominations
The 2014 ceremony was nominated for three awards, and only won one, which was the "Best Variety Special" awarded to the second show; it was Star Awards sixth win for this category, and the fifth consecutive time on doing so.

See also
 List of variety and infotainment programmes broadcast by MediaCorp Channel 8
 MediaCorp Channel 8
 MediaCorp Channel U
 Star Awards

References 

Star Awards